Ballari Junction railway station, formerly Bellary Junction railway station (station code: BAY) is a main railway station in Ballari district, Karnataka. It serves Ballari. This is one of the oldest railway stations in India, and possibly the second in karnataka, built by the British Raj more than 150 years ago. The foundation stone for Ballari Junction was laid on 1869.  Mahatma Gandhi visited Ballari and spent about eight hours at the railway station here on 1 October 1921.

Previously, the Ballari was part of Southern Mahratta Railway on Hubballi–Guntakal rail line. station consists of four platforms for its junction for three routes going towards Rayadurgam, Guntakal and Hosapete.

References

 Railway junction stations in Karnataka
Railway stations in Bellary district
Hubli railway division